The GB Pro-Series Glasgow is a professional tennis tournament played on indoor hardcourts. The tournament was previously part of the ATP Challenger Tour and is currently part of the ITF Women's Circuit and the ITF Men's Circuit. The tournament is held in Glasgow, United Kingdom, since 1998.

Past finals

Men's singles

Men's doubles

Women's singles

Women's doubles

References

External links
Official website

ATP Challenger Tour
ITF Women's World Tennis Tour
Hard court tennis tournaments
Recurring sporting events established in 1998
Tennis tournaments in Scotland